Methyl trifluoromethanesulfonate, also commonly called methyl triflate and abbreviated MeOTf, is the organic compound with the formula CF3SO2OCH3.  It is a colourless liquid which finds use in organic chemistry as a powerful methylating agent.  The compound is closely related to methyl fluorosulfonate (FSO2OCH3). Although there has yet to be a reported human fatality, several cases were reported for methyl fluorosulfonate (LC50 (rat, 1 h) = 5 ppm), and methyl triflate is expected to have similar toxicity based on available evidence.

Synthesis
Methyl triflate is commercially available, however it may also be prepared in the laboratory by treating dimethyl sulfate with triflic acid. 
CF3SO2OH  +  (CH3O)2SO2   →   CF3SO2OCH3  + CH3OSO2OH

Reactivity

Hydrolysis
Upon contact with water, methyl triflate loses its methyl group, forming triflic acid and methanol:

CF3SO2OCH3 + H2O → CF3SO2OH + CH3OH

Methylation
One ranking of methylating agents is (CH3)3O+ > CF3SO2OCH3 ≈ FSO2OCH3 > (CH3)2SO4 > CH3I.  Methyl triflate will alkylate many functional groups which are very poor nucleophiles such as aldehydes, amides, and nitriles.  It does not methylate benzene or the bulky 2,6-di-tert-butylpyridine.  Its ability to methylate N-heterocycles is exploited in certain deprotection schemes.

Cationic polymerization 
Methyl triflate initiates the living cationic polymerization of lactide and other lactones including β-propiolactone, ε-caprolactone and glycolide.

Cyclic carbonates like trimethylene carbonate and neopentylene carbonate (5,5-dimethyl-1,3-dioxan-2-one) can be polymerized to the corresponding polycarbonates. 2-alkyl-2-oxazolines, for example 2-ethyl-2-oxazoline, are also polymerized to poly(2-alkyloxazoline)s.

Applications

Radiochemistry 
Carbon-11 methyl triflate ([11C]MeOTf), or methyl triflate containing the carbon-11 isotope, is commonly used in radiochemistry to synthesize radioactively labeled compounds that can be traced in living organisms using positron emission tomography (PET). For example, [11C]MeOTf has been used extensively in the production of Pittsburgh Compound B, which first allowed β-amyloid plaques to be imaged in a living brain.

See also
 Triflate
 Magic methyl

References

Methylating agents
Methyl esters
Triflate esters